The 1981–82 Scottish Second Division was won by Clyde who, along with second placed Alloa Athletic, were promoted to the First Division. Stranraer finished bottom.

Table

References 

 Rsssf

Scottish Second Division seasons
3
Scot